Robert Louie is a Canadian First Nations leader, lawyer, and business person. He is known especially for his role in negotiating the Westbank Self-Government Agreement, which granted his band control over land management, language, and culture.

Early life and education

Born in 1959, 
he received a diploma in Business Administration, Management, and
Operations from Okanagan College in 1975 and his LL.B. from the University of Victoria in 1982.

Political career
He was chief of the Westbank First Nation from 1986 to 1996 and from 2002 to 2016 and served on the Task Group of the First Nations Summit.
 In September, 2022 he was returned to his former position as Westbank chief.

Business
Since 2014 he has owned and operated Indigenous World, a collection of businesses
With his wife Bernice, Louie founded the Indigenous World Winery, some of whose wines have won awards.

Service

He has been Chairman of the First Nations Lands Advisory Board since 1989
and of the Audit Committee of Peace Hills Trust since 2012.

He has served on the boards of the University of British Columbia (2006-2007),
the National Aboriginal Economic Development Board (1996-1999),
the First Nations Finance Authority (1995-1997),
the All Nations Trust Company (1988-1991)
the Kelowna Chamber of Commerce (1986--1987)
the United Nations Friendship Society (1985-1986)
and the BC Small Business Roundtable (2004-2006)
and on the President's Advisory Council of the University of British Columbia Okanagan and
the Premier's Advisory Council on Aboriginal Affairs].

Honours
In 2006 he was honoured as an Officer of the Order of Canada.

He received the Queen Elizabeth 2nd Jubilee Medal in 2012, an Honorary Doctor of Laws from the Justice Institute of British Columbia in 2014 and the B.C. Aboriginal Business Lifetime Achievement Award in 2016.

In 2022 he received the Canadian Council for Aboriginal Business Lifetime Achievement Award.

External links
Indigenous World Winery web site

References

Living people
1959 births
20th-century First Nations people
21st-century First Nations people
First Nations lawyers
First Nations politicians
Indigenous leaders in British Columbia
People from the Regional District of Central Okanagan
University of Victoria alumni
Officers of the Order of Canada
First Nations Summit Task Group members